Alerting system may refer to:
 Notification system, a combination of software and hardware that provides a means of delivering a message to a set of recipients
 A system that allows alert messaging, machine-to-person communication that is important or time sensitive
 Emergency communication system, any system organized for the primary purpose of supporting communication of emergency information

Human–computer interaction